Sir Herbert Cecil Stronge, KC (3 January 1875 – 22 August 1963) was an Anglo-Irish barrister and British colonial judge.

Life and career
The elder son of S. E. Stronge, MA, ISO, and Minnie L. Stronge, Herbert Stronge was educated at the Falmouth School and Trinity College, Dublin, where he took a BA and was Prizeman in Classics and English Literature.

He was called to the Irish Bar in 1900 and joined the North-East Circuit in 1901, practising in Belfast; he eventually became a King's Counsel. He was appointed as a stipendiary magistrate in the Bahamas in 1911, and acted as Attorney-General of the Bahamas in 1914 and 1915. From 1917 to 1925 he was Chief Justice of the Tonga Protectorate. From 1925 to 1931 he was Chief Justice of the Leeward Islands. From 1931 until his retirement in 1938 he was Chief Justice of Cyprus. He was knighted in 1930. He died in Durban, South Africa in 1963.

References

Sources
 https://www.ukwhoswho.com/view/10.1093/ww/9780199540891.001.0001/ww-9780199540884-e-50763

Alumni of Trinity College Dublin
1875 births
1963 deaths
Chief justices of Tonga
Irish barristers
Irish knights
Irish Queen's Counsel
Irish colonial officials
Knights Bachelor
Colony of the Bahamas judges
Irish emigrants to South Africa